Nurul Amin Ruhul, also known as Ruhul Bhai (born 14 October 1959), is a Bangladeshi politician. Currently, he represents the Chandpur-2 constituency in the Bangladesh Parliament.

Political life
Nurul Amin was elected a member of parliament from Chandpur-2 (Matlab North and South) constituency by defeating BNP's Jalal Uddin in the nomination of Bangladesh Awami League in the eleventh parliamentary elections in 2018. He was elected as the member of the Awami League's Dhaka University [5] Prior to this, he was the president of Bangladesh Chhatra League's publicity secretary and the chairman of the undivided Dhaka Metropolitan Chhatra League.

References

External links

Awami League politicians
People from Chandpur District
Living people
1959 births
11th Jatiya Sangsad members
University of Dhaka alumni